Miss International 1981, the 21st Miss International pageant, was held on 6 September 1981 in Kobe, Japan. It was won by Jenny Annette Derek from Australia.

Results

Placements

Contestants

  - Jenny Derek
  - Barbara Reimund
  - Dominique Van Eeckhoudt
  - Taiomara Do Rocio Borchardt
  - Carol Donlon
  - Victoria Eugenia Cárdenas Gerlein
  - Trylce Jirón García
  - Tina Brandstrup
  - Susan Elizabeth Hutt
  - Merja Orvokki Varvikko
  - Beatriz Peyet
  - Barbara Reimund
  - Katerina Kondylatou
  - Cecilia Daga Diaz
  - Dana Fu
  - Ine Hoedemaeckers
  - Gloria Patricia Durón
  - Deborah Carol Moore
  - Hlif Hansen
  - Meenakshi  Seshadri
  - Michelle Mary Teresa Rocca
  - Li’ora Goldberg
  - Veronica Piazza
  - Mika Moriwaki
  - Park Hyun-joo
  - Gurmit Kaur
  - Maria Fabiola Torres Sariat
  - Elizabeth Mary Ivan
  - Helen Holager
  - Alice Veronica "Peachy" Fernandez Sacasas
  - Margaret Bisset
  - Shanaz Ali Hussein Gandhi
  - Francisca "Paquita" Ondiviela Otero
  - Ana Helena Lindgow
  - Brigitte Voss
  - Maimiti Kinnander
  - Seenuan Attasara
  - Sevim Ciftci
  - Silvia Alonso
  - Lisa Margaret Schuman
  - Miriam Quintana Quintana
  - Sally Douglas Williams

Notes

Withdrawals
  - Rosario Suárez - became ill just before the finals.

References

1981
1981 in Japan
1981 beauty pageants
Beauty pageants in Japan